John Patrick (10 January 1870 – 30 November 1945) was a Scottish footballer who played as a goalkeeper in the 1890s.

Patrick was born in Kilsyth, and after playing for Grangemouth and Falkirk he joined St Mirren. In 1896 he had a trial in the Football League with Everton but he only played one league game before returning to St Mirren,  continuing as the regular goalkeeper until 1901 (Livingstone Rae became the new regular following a year when several players were tried). 

Patrick made his debut for the Scotland national football team on 20 March 1897 against Wales in Wrexham. His second and final cap for Scotland came two weeks later against England. He also represented the Scottish Football League XI on two occasions.

References 

1870 births
1945 deaths 
People from Kilsyth
Scottish footballers
Association football goalkeepers
Scotland international footballers
Scottish Football League players
English Football League players
St Mirren F.C. players
Everton F.C. players
Scottish Football League representative players
Falkirk F.C. players
Footballers from North Lanarkshire